Klaus Sperber (24 January 1944 – 6 August 1983), known professionally as Klaus Nomi, was a German countertenor noted for his wide vocal range and an unusual, otherworldly stage persona.

In the 1970s Nomi immersed himself in the East Village art scene. He was known for his bizarre and visionary theatrical live performances, heavy make-up, unusual costumes, and a highly stylized signature hairdo that flaunted a receding hairline. His songs were equally unusual, ranging from synthesizer-laden interpretations of classical opera to covers of 1960s pop standards like Chubby Checker's "The Twist" and Lou Christie's "Lightnin' Strikes". Nomi was one of David Bowie's backup singers for a 1979 performance on Saturday Night Live.

Biography

Early life and career 
Klaus Nomi was born Klaus Sperber in Immenstadt, Bavaria, Germany on January 24, 1944. In the 1960s, he worked as an usher at the Deutsche Oper in West Berlin where he sang for the other ushers and maintenance crew on stage in front of the fire curtain after performances. He also sang opera arias at the Berlin gay discothèque Kleist Casino.

Nomi emigrated to New York City in 1972. He did some off-Broadway theater work and moonlighted as a pastry chef.

In 1977, Nomi appeared in a satirical camp production of Richard Wagner's Das Rheingold at Charles Ludlam's Ridiculous Theater Company as the Rheinmaidens and the Wood Bird.

Music career 
Nomi came to the attention of the East Village art scene in 1978 with his performance in "New Wave Vaudeville", a four-night event MC'd by artist David McDermott. Dressed in a skin-tight spacesuit with a clear plastic cape, Nomi sang the aria "Mon cœur s'ouvre à ta voix" ("My heart opens to your voice") from Camille Saint-Saëns' opera Samson et Dalila. The performance ended with a chaotic crash of strobe lights, smoke bombs, and loud electronic sound effects as Nomi backed away into the smoke. Joey Arias recalled: "I still get goose pimples when I think about it... It was like he was from a different planet and his parents were calling him home. When the smoke cleared, he was gone." After that performance Nomi was invited to perform at clubs all over New York City.

At the New Wave Vaudeville show Nomi met Kristian Hoffman, songwriter for the Mumps. Hoffman was a performer and MC in the second incarnation of New Wave Vaudeville and a close friend of Susan Hannaford and Tom Scully, who produced the show, and Ann Magnuson, who directed it. Anya Phillips, then manager of James Chance and the Contortions, suggested Nomi and Hoffman form a band. Hoffman became Nomi's de facto musical director, assembling a band that included Page Wood from another New Wave vaudeville act, Come On, and Joe Katz, who was concurrently in The Student Teachers, the Accidents, and The Mumps.

Hoffman helped Nomi choose his pop covers, including the Lou Christie song "Lightnin' Strikes". Hoffman wrote several pop songs with which Nomi is closely identified: "The Nomi Song", "Total Eclipse", "After The Fall", and "Simple Man", the title song of Nomi's second RCA French LP. This configuration of the Klaus Nomi band performed at Manhattan clubs, including several performances at Max's Kansas City, Danceteria, Hurrah and the Mudd Club. He also appeared on Manhattan Cable's TV Party.

Disagreements with the management Nomi engaged led to a dissolution of this band, and Nomi continued without them. In the late 1970s, while performing at Club 57, The Mudd Club, The Pyramid Club, and other venues, Nomi assembled various up-and-coming models, singers, artists, and musicians to perform live with him, including Joey Arias, Keith Haring, John Sex and Kenny Scharf. He was briefly involved with Jean-Michel Basquiat, then known for his graffiti art as SAMO.

Nomi and Arias were introduced to David Bowie at the Mudd Club, who hired them as performers and backup singers for his appearance on Saturday Night Live on December 15, 1979. They performed "TVC 15", "The Man Who Sold the World", and "Boys Keep Swinging". During the performance of "TVC 15", Nomi and Arias dragged around a large prop pink poodle with a television screen in its mouth. Nomi was so impressed with the plastic quasi-tuxedo suit that Bowie wore during "The Man Who Sold the World" that he commissioned one for himself. He wore the suit on the cover of his self-titled album, as well as during a number of his music videos. Nomi wore his variant of the outfit, in monochromatic black-and-white with spandex and makeup to match, until the last few months of his life.

Nomi played a supporting role as a Nazi official in Anders Grafstrom's 1980 underground film The Long Island Four.

The 1981 rock documentary film Urgh! A Music War features Nomi's live performance of "Total Eclipse." His performance of "Mon cœur s'ouvre à ta voix" was used for the closing credits. In the liner notes of Nomi's 1981 self-titled record, 666 Fifth Avenue was listed as the contact address.

He released his second album, Simple Man, in November 1982. He also collaborated with producer Man Parrish, appearing on Parrish's 1982 album Man Parrish as a backup vocalist on the track "Six Simple Synthesizers".

In the last several months of his life, Nomi changed his focus to operatic pieces and adopted a Baroque era operatic outfit complete with full collar as his typical onstage attire. The collar helped cover the outbreaks of Kaposi's sarcoma on his neck, one of the numerous AIDS-related diseases Nomi developed toward the end of his life.

Za Bakdaz, a suite of home-studio recordings circa 1979 restored by Page Wood and George Elliott, was released in 2007.

Illness and death 
Nomi died at the Sloan Kettering Hospital Center in New York City on August 6, 1983, as a result of complications from AIDS. He was one of the earliest known figures from the arts community to die from the illness. Upon his death, Nomi's close friend Joey Arias became the executor of his estate. Following cremation, Nomi's ashes were scattered in New York City.

Legacy
Filmmakers such as Andrew Horn and writers such as Jim Fouratt consider Nomi an important part of the 1980s East Village scene, which was a hotbed of development for punk rock music, the visual arts and the avant-garde. Although Nomi's work had not yet met with national commercial success at the time of his death, he garnered a cult following, mainly in New York and in France. Andrew Horn's 2004 feature documentary about Nomi's life, The Nomi Song, which was released by Palm Pictures, helped spur renewed interest in the singer, including an art exhibit in San Francisco at the New Langton Arts gallery and one in Milan at the Res Pira Lab, which subsequently moved to Berlin's Strychnin Gallery, called "Do You Nomi?". New music pieces inspired by Nomi were commissioned by the gallery for a variety of European musicians, including Ernesto Tomasini.

In pop culture

In 2001, German pop duo Rosenstolz and English singer Marc Almond recorded a cover version of "Total Eclipse". Garbage used his "Valentine’s Day" song as the basis for their 2012 "Beloved Freak".

Nomi makes an appearance in Derf Backderf's graphic novel Punk Rock and Trailer Parks, released in 2008.

Nomi is one of the Sovereign's bodyguards in the Adult Swim series The Venture Bros. The Sovereign is the leader of the Guild of Calamitous Intent, and often takes the form of David Bowie.

In the film Suspiria (2018), Nomi singing "Total Eclipse" can be heard in the background on the radio in the room of another dancer.

Discography

Albums
 1981: Klaus Nomi (RCA)
 1982: Simple Man (RCA)
 2007: Za Bakdaz: The Unfinished Opera (Heliocentric)

Compilations
 1983: Encore
 1991: The Collection

Live
 1986: In Concert (RCA) – Recorded in 1979

Singles
 1981: "Total Eclipse" / "Falling in Love Again (Can't Help It)"
 1981: "You Don't Own Me" / "Falling in Love Again (Can't Help It)"
 1982: "Simple Man" / "Death"
 1982: "Ding-Dong! The Witch Is Dead" / "ICUROK"
 1982: "Nomi Song" / "Cold Song"
 1982: "Lightnin' Strikes" / "Falling in Love Again (Can't Help It)"
 1983: "ICUROK" / "Ding-Dong! The Witch Is Dead"
 1983: "Just One Look" / "Rubberband Lazer"
 1986: "I Feel Love"
 1998: "Za Bak Daz" / "Silent Night"

Music videos
 1982: "Simple Man" (directed and edited by John Zieman)
 1982: "Lightning Strikes"
 1982: "Nomi Song"
 1982: "Falling in Love Again"

Film appearances
 Long Island Four (1979)
 Mr. Mike's Mondo Video (1979)
 Urgh! A Music War (1982)
 The Nomi Song (2004)

See also 
 LGBT culture in New York City
 List of LGBT people from New York City

References

External links
 Klaus Nomi papers, circa 1950-1983, Houghton Library, Harvard University
 
 

1944 births
1983 deaths
AIDS-related deaths in New York (state)
German countertenors
Dark cabaret musicians
German electronic musicians
German experimental musicians
German new wave musicians
German performance artists
German male singer-songwriters
Avant-garde singers
German gay musicians
German LGBT singers
German LGBT songwriters
Performance art in New York City
People from Immenstadt
Synth-pop singers
Gay singers
Gay songwriters
20th-century German male singers
20th-century German LGBT people
German emigrants to the United States
People from the East Village, Manhattan
RCA Records artists